Season seventeen of Dancing with the Stars premiered on September 16, 2013, on the ABC network.

On November 26, actress Amber Riley and Derek Hough were crowned the champions, while actor Corbin Bleu and Karina Smirnoff finished in second place, and Jack Osbourne and Cheryl Burke finished in third. 

This is the first season since season one to not have a Tuesday results show. The sky box where host Brooke Burke Charvet interviewed dancers after their performances was also eliminated. Instead, the couples were accommodated in a new seating area near the judges' table, which had also been shifted to the opposite side of the ballroom. A make-up room and rehearsal room were added where Charvet could chat with the couples before and after their performances.

This season also introduced a new format of voting. Each week, the judges would give each couple a score. Since there was no results show, those scores would be added to the public votes from the previous week, and the couple with the lowest combined score from judges and viewer votes would be eliminated from the competition at the end of that week's episode.

Cast

Couples
The cast of twelve and their professional partners was announced on September 4, 2013, on Good Morning America. Tyne Stecklein, Emma Slater, and Sasha Farber joined the cast of professional dancers. Gleb Savchenko and Lindsay Arnold joined Henry Byalikov and Witney Carson in the dance troupe, reducing the troupe to four professional dancers.

Host and judges
Tom Bergeron and Brooke Burke Charvet returned as co-hosts, and Carrie Ann Inaba, Len Goodman, and Bruno Tonioli returned as judges. The Harold Wheeler orchestra and singers also returned to provide the music throughout what would end up being their last season. This was also Brooke Burke-Charvet's last season as co-host.

Scoring charts

Notes

 : This was the lowest score of the week.
 : This was the highest score of the week.
 :  This couple finished in first place.
 :  This couple finished in second place.
 :  This couple finished in third place.
 :  This couple was eliminated.

Highest and lowest scoring performances
The highest and lowest performances in each dance according to the judges' 30-point scale are as follows. Scores by guest judges are not counted.

Couples' highest and lowest scoring dances
Scores are based upon a potential 30-point maximum. Scores by guest judges are not counted.

Weekly scores
Individual judges' scores in the charts below (given in parentheses) are listed in this order from left to right: Carrie Ann Inaba, Len Goodman, Bruno Tonioli.

Week 1: First Dances
Couples are listed in the order they performed.

Week 2: Latin Night
Couples are listed in the order they performed.

Week 3: Hollywood Night
Couples are listed in the order they performed.

Week 4: Top 10
Individual judges scores and votes in the charts below (given in parentheses) are listed from left to right: Carrie Ann Inaba, Julianne Hough, Bruno Tonioli.

Couples are listed in the order they performed.

Week 5: Most Memorable Year Night
Couples are listed in the order they performed.

Week 6: Switch-Up Challenge
Due to a technical error the previous week in which incorrect voting numbers were displayed for the couples, the votes were subsequently thrown out and no couple was eliminated. Instead, the judges' scores and viewer votes carried over to the following week.

In the Switch-Up Challenge, all eight couples were divided into two groups of four. In marathon-style, they all danced to four songs they had not previously rehearsed and were scored on their ability to interpret the music, transition from one song to another, and stay on time. Couples are listed in the order they performed.

Week 7: Team Dance Night
Each couple performed one unlearned dance and a Halloween-themed team freestyle. The teams were chosen by the highest scoring couples: Amber & Derek (Team "FoxingAwesome") and Elizabeth & Val (Team "Spooky BomBom"). Couples are listed in the order they performed.

Week 8: Cher Night
Individual judges scores and votes in the charts below (given in parentheses) are listed from left to right: Carrie Ann Inaba, Cher, Bruno Tonioli.

All of the dance routines were performed to songs by Cher. In addition, after the individual routines were performed, the highest-scorers, Amber & Derek, received immunity and avoided elimination for this week. The remaining six couples competed in pairs in a dance-off challenge, with the winners receiving an additional three points that were added to their scores. Couples are listed in the order they performed.

Week 9: Trio Night
Each couple performed one unlearned ballroom dance and one trio dance. Each couple chose one professional who was either previously eliminated or participated in the dance troupe. Couples are listed in the order they performed.

Week 10: Plugged/Unplugged Night
Individual judges scores in the chart below (given in parentheses) are listed from left to right: Carrie Ann Inaba, Len Goodman, Maksim Chmerkovskiy, Bruno Tonioli.

The couples performed two different dance styles to the original version (plugged) and an acoustic version (unplugged) of the same song. Couples are listed in the order they performed. 

The unplugged versions of Corbin & Karina's rumba and Amber & Derek's Viennese waltz were performed by Kerli. Noah Guthrie performed the unplugged version of Bill E. & Emma's Argentine tango.

Week 11: Finals
Each couple performed a dance chosen by one of the judges in hopes of improving their original scores, a samba relay, and a supersized freestyle. At the end of the night, one couple was eliminated. On the second night, the three couples performed a fusion dance of two previously learned dance styles. Couples are listed in the order they performed.

Night 1

Night 2

Dance chart
The celebrities and professional partners danced one of these routines for each corresponding week:
 Week 1 (First Dances): One unlearned dance 
 Week 2 (Latin Night): One unlearned dance 
 Week 3 (Hollywood Night): One unlearned dance 
 Week 4 (Top 10): One unlearned dance
 Week 5 (Most Memorable Year Night): One unlearned dance 
 Week 6 (Switch-Up Challenge): One unlearned dance & switch-up dance 
 Week 7 (Team Dance Night): One unlearned dance & team dances 
 Week 8 (Cher Night): One unlearned dance & dance-offs 
 Week 9 (Trio Night): One unlearned dance & trio dances 
 Week 10 (Plugged/Unplugged Night): Two unlearned dances 
 Week 11 (Finals, Night 1): Judge's choice, samba relay & freestyle
 Week 11 (Finals, Night 2): Fusion dance

Notes

 :  This was the highest scoring dance of the week.
 :  This was the lowest scoring dance of the week.
 :  This couple gained bonus points for winning this dance-off.
 :  This couple gained no bonus points for losing this dance-off.
 :  This couple earned immunity and did not have to compete in the dance-off.
 :  This couple danced, but received no scores.

Ratings

References

External links

Dancing with the Stars (American TV series)
2013 American television seasons